Wonder Cave is a show cave located in the Balcones Fault in San Marcos, Texas.   Its entrance is one mile southwest of the county courthouse in San Marcos.  The cave is reported to be the only commercially operated dry-formed cave in the United States ("dry-formed" because the fissure was opened not by erosion but by the earthquake that produced the Balcones Fault). The fault itself is visible in the cave's ceiling.  Originally named Bevers Cave after Mark Bevers, who discovered it in 1893, the cave for a while concealed Bevers' illicit distilling and gambling enterprises.

The cave is also home to Wonder World amusement park, which features tours of the multichambered cave and a wildlife park.  .

Notes

External links 
Show Caves of the United States of America: Wonder Cave
Major Faults of the Edwards Aquifer
Texas Speleological Survey - Wonder Cave
Wonder World Park

San Marcos, Texas
Caves of Texas
Show caves in the United States
Tourist attractions in Hays County, Texas
Landforms of Hays County, Texas